A. C. Schweinfurth (1864–1900), born Albert Cicero Schweinfurth, was an American architect. He is associated with the First Bay Tradition.

The son of a German woodcarver who had immigrated to the United States a decade before his son Albert was born. His brothers Charles, Julius and Henry also practiced in the architectural profession.

Schweinfurth began his career in 1879. For the next decade he worked as a draftsman for various firms in Boston, Cleveland, New York, and Denver. In 1890, he moved to San Francisco and took a position as Chief Draftsman in the offices of A. Page Brown.

In 1894, Schweinfurth established his own architectural practice under the patronage of William Randolf Hearst. His Hacienda del Pozo de Verona (1894–1898), built for Phoebe Apperson Hearst in Pleasanton, was one of the first American buildings to incorporate features of Pueblo Revival architecture.

Schweinfurth also designed the First Unitarian Church,  a "landmark in the history of Bay Area architecture" (1898), on the University of California, Berkeley campus, as well as the Moody House situated on Le Roy Avenue in Berkeley, California.

In 1898, Schweinfurth embarked on a two-year tour of Italy and France with his wife, Fanny, and their seven-year-old daughter. Shortly after returning to the United States, he suffered an attack of typhoid fever. He died on September 27, 1900, in Dryden, N.Y.

References

1864 births
1900 deaths
Architects from Massachusetts
Architects from Colorado
Architects from California
19th-century American architects
Deaths from typhoid fever
Architecture in the San Francisco Bay Area